Beyblade is a 2001 Korean-Japanese collaboration anime television series based on Takao Aoki's manga series of the same name, which itself is based on the Beyblade spinning top game from Takara Tomy. The 51-episode series was produced by Madhouse under the direction of Toshifumi Kawase.

The series was first broadcast on TV Tokyo in Japan from January 8 to December 24, 2001. In Korea, it broadcast on SBS since October 2001.The season was licensed for English adaptation, broadcast, and release by Nelvana. The series was broadcast on the sibling cable channel YTV in Canada and ABC Family in the United States in 2002.

Lukas Rossi.



Episode list

References

Beyblade Season 1
2001 Japanese television seasons